Darren England is a Premier League football referee, who was promoted in August 2020.  In December 2021, the PGMOL announced that England had been added to the 2022 FIFA List of International Match Officials.

Prior to this, England had been a Select Group 2 referee since 2017, and prior to this, he had been a Premier League assistant referee between 2012 and 2015.

Career 
He refereed the League Two Play-Off Final in 2017 between Blackpool v Exeter City and then was promoted to the Select Group 2 list.

References 

English referees and umpires
1985 births
Living people
Premier League referees